, there were about 62,000 electric vehicles in New York, accounting for 0.6% of all vehicles in the state.

Government policy
In August 2009, the New York State Energy Research and Development Authority began a study on the effects of plug-in electric vehicles on the state's power grid.

In September 2021, Governor Kathy Hochul signed into law a bill requiring all new vehicles sold in the state to be zero-emission by 2035.

In January 2022, the state government announced  to be spent on the state's electric vehicle tax rebate program, which offers rebates of up to $2,000 for each electric vehicle purchase.

State fleet
On August 2, 2006, Governor George E. Pataki and State Senate Majority Leader Joseph Bruno announced plans for a new  State program to convert 600 vehicles in the state fleet to plug-in hybrid, conduct testing for greenhouse gas reduction technologies, and improve the efficiency of public transportation systems. The first plug-in hybrid was added to the fleet on December 20, 2006.

Charging stations
, there were about 9,300 charging stations in the state.

By region

Albany
In October 2021, Albany County announced a plan to transition the county fleet entirely to electric by 2030.

Buffalo
, there were about 1,900 electric vehicles registered in Erie County.

New York City
, there were about 21,000 electric vehicles registered in New York City. 10,000 were registered in Brooklyn, 4,000 in Manhattan, 4,000 in Queens, 1,700 in the Bronx, and 1,200 in Staten Island. , there were about 8,000 electric vehicles registered in Suffolk County, and 6,000 in Nassau County.

, there were 100 public curbside charging stations in New York City.

In October 2021, Suffolk County and Westchester County announced plans to transition the county fleets entirely to electric by 2030.

This is the largest investment in electric vehicles ever made by any local government in the United States.

Rochester
In July 2022, the Rochester municipal government introduced an electric vehicle carsharing service.

References

Road transportation in New York (state)
New York